Claudy Jongstra (born 6 February 1963) is a Dutch artist and textile designer.

Biography
Jongstra studied fashion design at the Utrecht School of the Arts between 1982 and 1989. Her work is characterized by her use of wool in the form of handcrafted felt.  Much of the wool she uses is from Drenthe Heath sheep, which she raises herself in the Northern Netherlands. She often colors the wool with vegetable dyes made from vegetables grown in her own garden.  

She is known, in particular, for the unique kinds of hybrid or nuno felts she creates through combining a variety of materials with wool.  These combined fibers include silk, linen, and chiffons, as well as fibers from animals such as yak or camel.  Her felting process is also distinguished by the multiple stages of reworking required for achieving certain effects.

One of her early major assignments involved working on the fabrics for the Jedi costumes in Star Wars Episode 1. She also produced fabrics for fashion and furniture designers, including Alexander van Slobbe, Maarten Baas, Hella Jongerius, John Galliano, Christian Lacroix and Donna Karan. Later in her career, Jongstra started creating large-scale works of art, displayed at museums such as the Fries Museum, the Provinciehuis in Leeuwarden, the Amsterdam Public Library and the San Francisco Museum of Modern Art.

In 2009, her work was selected for inclusion in "Fashioning Felt", an international show on felt sponsored by the Smithsonian, which was exhibited at the Cooper-Hewitt National Design Museum in New York City. 

The work of Claudy Jongstra is included in various museum collections, including the Stedelijk Museum Amsterdam, the Rijksmuseum, the Victoria and Albert Museum and the Museum of Modern Art.

Solo exhibitions
2016: Aarde, San Francisco Museum of Modern Art
2013: Sculptuur Fries Landschap, Fries Museum entrance hall, Leeuwarden
2012: Mother of Pearl, Barnes Foundation, main building and restaurant, Philadelphia
2010: North Wall Atrium installation, Lincoln Center for the Performing Arts, New York
2007: Wall decoration, Amsterdam Public Library entrance
2005: Wall decoration, Kunsthal restaurant, Rotterdam
2004: Tapestry, Dutch Embassy, Berlin
2003: Mother of Pearl and Blue silver, Catshuis ladies room and dining room, the Hague

Group exhibitions
2011: United Nations, New York
2007: Architecture Biennale, Sao Paulo
2006: TextielMuseum, Tilburg

Awards
2008: Prince Bernhard Culture Fund, Prize for Visual Arts
2005: Vredeman de Vries Prize
2005: Amsterdam Award for Art

References

Further viewing

External links

1963 births
Living people
20th-century Dutch artists
21st-century Dutch artists
20th-century Dutch women artists
21st-century Dutch women artists
People from Roermond
Textile designers
Utrecht School of the Arts alumni